A Thousand Kisses is a 2006 Dutch drama film directed by Willem van de Sande Bakhuyzen. It was based on the novel of the same name by Ronald Giphart.

Plot

Giph (Tijn Docter) is a young security guard and writer. He has a  girlfriend Samarinde (Carice van Houten), who is a physician and model. He is on holiday in Spain with her and their friends. Giph's mother Lotti has recently died. Giph plans to end the relationship after the holiday. Samarinde turns out be pregnant. The question arises whether Samarinde will have an induced abortion. However, she has a miscarriage. Giph loves Samarinde again and they continue the relationship.

A large part of the film consists of flashbacks, about Lotti's multiple sclerosis and euthanasia by lethal injection, and Giph's relationship with Samarinde.

External links

Dutch drama films
2006 drama films
2006 films